Coenogonium is a genus of crustose lichens in the  monotypic family Coenogoniaceae. It has about 90 species. Most species are leaf-dwelling or grow on bark, although a few are known to grow on rocks under certain conditions, and some are restricted to growth on termite nests. The genus was circumscribed in 1820 by German naturalist Christian Gottfried Ehrenberg.

Coenogonium has a worldwide distribution, with most species known from tropical areas. Most species grow in tropical rain forests in the shaded understorey. They typically inhabit tree trunks, branches, lianas, and leaves.

Description

Although members of Coenogonium are relatively easy to identify given its unique characteristics, identifying to species is more difficult due to the slight differences between them. The genus is characterized by biatorine (rarely zeorine), yellow to orange or brown apothecia with a paraplectenchymatous excipulum, partially amyloid hymenium (I+ blue then quickly sordid green then red-brown), thin-walled unitunicate asci, and 1-septate or rarely non-septate ascospores. The photobiont component of Coenogonium is a green alga from the family Trentepohliaceae. The structure of the Coenogonium thallus is largely determined by the algal partner.

Similar genera include Malcolmiella, which differs mainly by having amyloid asci with a thickened tholus and non-septate, usually longer and broader ascospores with an ornamented perispore; Absconditella, which has a chlorococcoid photobiont and non-amyloid asci; and Cryptodiscus, which has Gloeocystis as photobiont, amyloid asci with a thickened apex and non-septate paraphyses.

Research

Species of Coenogonium have frequently used in morphological/anatomical and ecophysiological studies. Examples include thallus growth, apothecial development, ultrastructure, photobiont and resynthesis in culture, and photosynthesis. The filamentous thalli of Coenogonium serve as a home for diatoms and other microorganisms. Johannes Müller Argoviensis even used his erroneous interpretation of the thallus organization of filamentous Coenogonium to oppose Simon Schwendener's theory of the symbiotic nature of lichens.

Species

The genus is quite well known in continental areas that border the Caribbean, such as Florida and Costa Rica. About half of the world's biodiversity of this genus occurs in Brazil.

Coenogonium aciculatum   – Costa Rica
Coenogonium agonimioides 
Coenogonium albomarginatum 
Coenogonium antonianum 
Coenogonium atherospermatis  – Australia
Coenogonium atroluteum  – Neotropics
Coenogonium aurantiacum  – Puerto Rico
Coenogonium australiense  – Australia
Coenogonium bacilliferum 
Coenogonium barbatellum 
Coenogonium barbatum  – Costa Rica
Coenogonium beaverae 
Coenogonium borinquense  – Puerto Rico
Coenogonium botryosum 
Coenogonium brasiliense 
Coenogonium bryophilum  – Australia
Coenogonium byssothallinum  – Costa Rica
Coenogonium chloroticum  – Brazil
Coenogonium ciliatum 
Coenogonium confervoides 
Coenogonium convexum  – Thailand
Coenogonium coppinsii  – Brazil
Coenogonium coralloideum 
Coenogonium coronatum 
Coenogonium curvulum 
Coenogonium dattatreyense 
Coenogonium davidii 
Coenogonium degeneri 
Coenogonium dilucidum 
Coenogonium dimorphicum  – Puerto Rico
Coenogonium disciforme  – Thailand
Coenogonium eximium – Neotropics
Coenogonium fallaciosum 
Coenogonium flammeum 
Coenogonium flavicans 
Coenogonium flavovirens 
Coenogonium flavoviride 
Coenogonium flavum 
Coenogonium frederici 
Coenogonium fruticulosum  – New Zealand
Coenogonium fuscescens 
Coenogonium geralense  – pantropical
Coenogonium hainanense  – China
Coenogonium hypophyllum 
Coenogonium implexum 
Coenogonium interplexum 
Coenogonium interpositum 
Coenogonium isidiatum 
Coenogonium isidiiferum 
Coenogonium isidiigerum 
Coenogonium isidiosum 
Coenogonium kalbii  – Costa Rica
Coenogonium kawanae 
Coenogonium kiggaense 
Coenogonium labyrinthicum 
Coenogonium linkii 
Coenogonium lisowskii 
Coenogonium lueckingii  – South Korea
Coenogonium luteocitrinum  – Neotropics
Coenogonium luteolum  – Europe
Coenogonium lutescens 
Coenogonium luteum 
Coenogonium magdalenae  – Costa Rica
Coenogonium maritimum  – Florida
Coenogonium minidenticulatum 
Coenogonium minimum 
Coenogonium minutissimum 
Coenogonium moniliforme 
Coenogonium nepalense  – Neotropics and eastern Paleotropics
Coenogonium perminutum 
Coenogonium persistens  – Neotropics
Coenogonium pertenue 
Coenogonium piliferum 
Coenogonium pineti 
Coenogonium platysporum 
Coenogonium pocsii  – African Paleotropics
Coenogonium portoricense  – Puerto Rico
Coenogonium pulchrum 
Coenogonium pusillum 
Coenogonium pyrophthalmum 
Coenogonium queenslandicum  – eastern Paleotropics
Coenogonium riparium 
Coenogonium roumeguerianum 
Coenogonium rubrofuscum 
Coenogonium saepincola  – Costa Rica
Coenogonium seychellense 
Coenogonium siquirrense 
Coenogonium stenosporum  – Neotropics
Coenogonium stramineum 
Coenogonium strigosum  – Neotropics
Coenogonium subborinquense  – Thailand
Coenogonium subdentatum  – Neotropics; eastern Paleotropics
Coenogonium subdilucidum 
Coenogonium subdilutum 
Coenogonium subdilutum 
Coenogonium subfallaciosum 
Coenogonium subluteum 
Coenogonium subsquamosum 
Coenogonium subzonatum 
Coenogonium tanzanicum 
Coenogonium tavaresianum 
Coenogonium theae 
Coenogonium upretianum  – Brazil
Coenogonium urceolatum  – Australia

Coenogonium usambarense  – African and eastern Paleotropics
Coenogonium verrucimarginatum  – Thailand
Coenogonium verrucosum  – South America
Coenogonium vezdanum 
Coenogonium weberi 
Coenogonium wernerhuberi  – Costa Rica
Coenogonium wrightii 
Coenogonium zonatum

References

Gyalectales
Gyalectales genera
Lichen genera
Taxa described in 1820
Taxa named by Christian Gottfried Ehrenberg